UDK may refer to:

 Berlin University of the Arts, from German Universität der Künste Berlin, UdK
 Unreal Development Kit, the freely available development kit for Unreal Engine 3
 Universal Decimal Classification, from Croatian Univerzalna decimalna klasifikacija
 "UDK", a song by Olivia O'Brien from her 2019 album Was It Even Real?
 The University Daily Kansan, the student newspaper of the University of Kansas